The Order of Saint Basil the Great (abbreviated OSBM), also known as the Basilian Order of Saint Josaphat, is a Greek Catholic monastic order of pontifical right that works actively among Ukrainian Catholics and other Greek-Catholic churches in central and Eastern Europe. The order received approbation on August 20, 1631, and is based at the Monastery of the Holy Trinity, Vilnius.

History

Revival 
In the 16th century, with the efforts of Metropolitan of Kiev Josyf Veliamyn Rutsky and Archbishop of Polotsk Josaphat Kuntsevych, the monastic order was revived on territory of the Polish–Lithuanian Commonwealth. Following World War II, the order was eliminated by the Russian Orthodox from its original territory and forced into exile. With the fall of the Soviet Union, it was reestablished again in modern Ukraine as part of the Ukrainian Greek Catholic Church.

Besides the Order of Saint Basil the Great, there is a smaller order of Studite Monks that was revived at the end of 19th century by Metropolitan of Galicia Andrey Sheptytsky and is based in the Univ Lavra.

The order is based upon the ascetic writings of Basil of Caesarea (329-379, in accordance with the Rule of St Basil laid down by him and later developed by Theodore the Studite (760-826), Theodosius of Kiev (†1074), Josaphat Kuntsevych (1580-1623), and the Metropolitan of Kiev Joseph Benjamin Rutsky (1574-1637).

Monastic life began to develop in Ukraine in the time of Vladimir the Great (980-1015), when the first monks settled in caves near Kiev, led by Anthony and Theodosius. After the Mongol invasions in the 13th century, the monks fled west to Halych-Volhynia and the Grand Duchy of Lithuania, spreading Eastern Monasticism there. The Eastern Rite Ruthenian Church (in modern-day Belarus and Ukraine) has re-affirmed its communion with the Catholic Church in the Union of Brest in 1596. The monasteries living according to the rules of St. Basil and St. Theodore Studite, previously undergoing a period of laxity and decline, were reformed by the initiative of Josaphat Kuntsevych and Joseph Benjamin Rutsky, beginning with the monastery of the Holy Trinity in Vilnius. Following this reform in 1617 the individual monasteries united into a single congregation under a Protarchimandrite directly subject to the Metropolitan, similar to the path Western Rite monasticism took during the Middle Ages. In 1739 a second congregation was formed by monasteries in Halychyna and in 1744 both congregations were united in the Ruthenian Order of St. Basil the Great by Pope Benedict XIV.

The Order of Saint Basil the Great spread and flourished across modern day Belarus and Ukraine and played a key role in the education both of laity and clergy, and helped to preserve the distinctiveness of the Ruthenian culture in the predominantly Polish and Roman Catholic Polish–Lithuanian Commonwealth until the partitions of Poland at the end of the 18th century. In 1772 the Order had over 200 monasteries and over 1000 monks, six seminaries, twenty schools and colleges, and four printing houses.

In the last years of the 18th century most of the Ruthenian lands came under the Russian Empire, where the Order along with the whole Ruthenian Church was persecuted. Eventually the monasteries were subjected to the Russian Orthodox Church. A small part of modern-day Ukraine came under Austrian rule where the fate of the Ruthenian Church was much better. However, the Order suffered under the policies of Emperor Joseph II directed against all religious orders. In the second half of the 19th century efforts were undertaken to renew the Order. By 1882 it was reduced to just 60 monks in 14 monasteries. With permission from Pope Leo XIII the Basilian Constitution was updated with help from the Society of Jesus starting with the Dobromyl monastery, by which it became less sedentary and more missionary, among other things allowing the monks to work with the Ukrainian diaspora overseas. The Basilians reached Brazil (1897), Canada (1902), United States (1907), and Argentina (1934). New provinces were established covering Transcarpathia, Hungary, and Yugoslavia and Romania. By 1939 the number of monks rose to over 650.  In 1944 the order purchased the John E. Aldred Estate at Lattingtown, New York, now known as St. Josaphat's Monastery.

Following the Second World War, the Soviets entered further into Europe and forced the Ukrainian Greek Catholic Church underground. In all of the Soviet-controlled territories only a single Basilian monastery was left open, in the Polish capital of Warsaw. Nonetheless, the Order survived among the Ukrainian diaspora in the free world (and in communist Yugoslavia where the regime was relatively benign) and in Ukraine itself where the monks secretly prayed and catechized.

After the collapse of the Soviet Union, the Order was reestablished in independent Ukraine and other Central and Eastern European countries such as Hungary, Romania, Slovakia and Portugal. Some old monasteries have been restored and new ones established. In 2001 there were over 600 monks, 300 of them in Ukraine.

List of monasteries

Current
 Monastery of the Holy Trinity (Vilnius, Lithuania)
 Monastery of the Basilian Order of Saint Josaphat (Fátima, Portugal)

Former
 Lauryshava Monastery, near Navahrudak
 Supraśl Orthodox Monastery, near Supraśl
 Slutsk Holy Trinity Monastery, near Slutsk

Notable Basilians
 Saint Josaphat Kuntsevych – Bishop and Martyr
 Blessed Josaphat Kotsylovsky –  Bishop and Martyr
 Blessed Paul Gojdič –  Bishop and Martyr
 Blessed Severian Baranyk –  Priest and Martyr
 Blessed Yakym Senkivskyi –  Priest and Martyr
 Blessed Vitaliy Bayrak – Priest and Martyr
 Venerable Andrey Sheptytsky – Confessor of the Faith
 Symeon of Polotsk – poet, dramatist, churchman, and enlightener
Sebastian Sabol – poet, writer, recipient of All-Ukrainian Literary Prize

See also
 Basilian monks
 Congregation of St. Basil

References

External links
History and facts about the Order of St. Basil the Great
ЧСВВ Провінція Найсвятішого Спасителя в Україні  Province of the Most Holy Redeemer in Ukraine

 
Basil
1631 establishments in the Papal States
Christian religious orders established in the 17th century
1631 establishments in Italy